Caladenia decora, commonly known as the Esperance king spider orchid is a species of orchid endemic to the south-west of Western Australia. It has a single hairy leaf and up to three red, yellow and green flowers. It is a variable species, similar to the king spider orchid (C. pectinata) and sometimes hybridises with other species so that it can be difficult to recognise, but is one of the largest spider orchids found in Western Australia.

Description
Caladenia decora is a terrestrial, perennial, deciduous, herb with an underground tuber and which grows as a solitary plant or in small clumps. The leaf is pale green and has purple-red blotches near its base.

The bases of the sepals and petals are linear to lance-shaped and held stiffly for about one-third, then suddenly narrow. The labellum is dark pink with red stripes and ends in a dark tip. There are four rows of pale maroon, golf stick-shaped calli in the centre of the labellum for at least three-quarters of its length, but decreasing in size towards its tip. Flowering occurs from mid-August to October.

This species is similar to the similarly-sized Caladenia pectinata but is more brightly coloured, often has gland-tipped petals and has a more easterly distribution. Hybrids with Caladenia longicauda subsp. crassa are common.

Taxonomy and naming
Caladenia decora was first formally described by Stephen Hopper and Andrew Brown in 2001 from a specimen collected by Hopper near the Jerdacuttup River north-east of Hopetoun. The description was published in Nuytsia. The specific epithet (decora) is a Latin word meaning "fitting", "proper" or "beautiful".

Distribution and habitat
The Esperance king spider orchid is found near the coast between Bremer Bay and Cape Arid in the Esperance Plains and Mallee biogeographic regions where it usually grows in shrubland and woodlands in winter-wet areas but sometimes also near granite outcrops.

Conservation
Caladenia decora is classified as "not threatened" by the Western Australian Government Department of Parks and Wildlife.

References

decora
Orchids of Western Australia
Endemic orchids of Australia
Plants described in 2001
Endemic flora of Western Australia
Taxa named by Stephen Hopper
Taxa named by Andrew Phillip Brown